San Dalmazzo may refer to:

 San Dalmazzo, Turin, Roman Catholic church in Turin, Italy
 Borgo San Dalmazzo, municipality in the Province of Cuneo in the Italian region Piedmont

See also 

 Dalmazzo